Defensive design is the practice of planning for contingencies in the design stage of a project or undertaking. Essentially, it is the practice of anticipating all possible ways that an end-user could misuse a device, and designing the device so as to make such misuse impossible, or to minimize the negative consequences. For example, if it is important that a plug is inserted into a socket in a particular orientation, the socket and plug should be designed so that it is physically impossible to insert the plug incorrectly. Power sockets are often keyed in such a manner, to prevent the transposition of live and neutral. They are also recessed in the wall in a way that makes it impossible to touch connectors once they become live.

Defensive design in software engineering is called defensive programming. Murphy's law is a well-known statement of the need for defensive design, and also of its ultimate limitations.

Applications

Computer software 

Software design entails many ways so that software can be designed to operate more safely.

 Data entry screens can "sanitize" inputs, e.g. numeric fields contain only digits, signs and a single decimal point if appropriate.

 Inputs can be checked for legitimate values, e.g. for counts of workplace injuries (or number of people injured) the number can be 0 but can't be negative and must be a whole number; for number of hours worked in one week the amount for any specified employee can be 0, can be fractional, but can't be negative and can't be greater than 168, nor more than 24 times the number of days they were in attendance.

 A word processor requested to load a saved document should scan it to ensure it is in good form and not corrupted. If it is corrupted, the program should say so, then either accept the partial document that was valid, or refuse the entire document. In either case it should remain running and not quit.

Electronics 

Many electrical connectors apply this principle by being asymmetric.

See also
 Defensible space theory
 Fail-safe
 Idiot proof
 Inherent safety
 Poka-yoke
 Usability testing

References

Design